This is a list of mosques in Guinea.

See also
 Islam in Guinea
 Lists of mosques

References

External links

 
Guinea
Mosques